For people with the surname, see Jibrin (surname).

Jibrin is a Syrian village and suburb of Hama, located in the Hama Subdistrict of the Hama District in the Hama Governorate. According to the Syria Central Bureau of Statistics (CBS), Jibrin had a population of 3,991 in the 2004 census.

References 

Populated places in Hama District